The 2022–23 Men's Euro Hockey League is the 16th season of the Euro Hockey League, Europe's men's premier club field hockey tournament, organized by the European Hockey Federation.

The first round was held from 30 September to 2 October 2022 and the Final8 will take place from 6 to 10 April 2023. Bloemendaal are the defending champions, having won a record fifth title in the previous edition.

Association team allocation
A total of 20 teams from 11 of the 45 EHF member associations participate in the 2022–23 Men's Euro Hockey League. The association ranking based on the EHL country coefficients was used to determine the number of participating teams for each association:
 Associations 1–3 each had three teams qualify.
 Associations 4–6 each had two teams qualify.
 Associations 7–11 each had one team qualify.

Association ranking
For the 2022–23 Euro Hockey League, the associations are allocated places according to their 2021–22 EHL country coefficients, which takes into account their performance in European competitions from 2019–20 to 2021–22.

Teams
The labels in the parentheses show how each team qualified for the place of its starting round:
1st, 2nd, 3rd: League positions of the previous season

Preliminary round
The Preliminary round was hosted by Harvestehuder THC in Hamburg, Germany from 29 September to 2 October 2022. The draw took place on 18 July 2022. The winners of the second round will advance to the quarter-finals during Easter 2023.

Bracket

First round

Ranking matches

Second round

Final8
The Final8 will be hosted by Pinoké at the Wagener Stadium in Amstelveen, Netherlands from 6 to 10 April 2023 alongside the women's tournament. The draw was held on 14 December 2022.

Bracket

Quarter-finals

Ranking matches

Semi-finals

Third and fourth place

Final

Top goalscorers

See also
 2023 Men's EuroHockey Indoor Club Cup
 2023 Women's Euro Hockey League

Notes

References

External links

Euro Hockey League
2022–23 in European field hockey
September 2022 sports events in Germany
October 2022 sports events in Germany
2022-23 Euro Hockey League
2022-23 Euro Hockey League

Current field hockey seasons
April 2023 sports events in Europe
2022-23 Euro Hockey League
Sports competitions in Amstelveen